Walerstein is a Jewish surname. Notable people with the surname include:

Gregorio Walerstein (1913–2002), Mexican film producer and screenwriter
Mauricio Walerstein (1945–2016), Mexican film director, screenwriter and film producer

See also
Wallerstein (disambiguation)

Jewish surnames